Symphony No. 2 in G minor, also known as Symphony No. 2 "Song of a New Race", is a 1937 composition in four movements by American composer William Grant Still. The work was first performed on December 10, 1937, by the Philadelphia Orchestra led by conductor Leopold Stokowski. The symphony is about thirty minutes long.

Overview
William Grant Still contrasted his Symphony No. 2 with his earlier Symphony No. 1. If Symphony No. 1 "represented the Negro of days not far removed from the Civil War," Symphony No. 2 represented "the American colored man of today, in so many instances a totally new individual produced through the fusion of White, Indian and Negro bloods". According to one reviewer commenting on the premiere performance of the symphony by the Philadelphia Orchestra, "[The symphony]s characteristically expansive, lyrical string writing seems specifically intended to exploit that orchestra’s famously silky string sound. Near the climax of the first movement, and at key moments elsewhere, the brasses-trumpets and trombones especially, punctuate the texture with gestures suggesting call and response, elements of the African American essence that persistently asserts itself even as blacks were more fully integrated into the wider, more diverse American culture."

Movements
The symphony is in four movements as follows:

Reviews
Allan Kozinn of The New York Times notes the work's, "bright, rhythmically vital third movement".

See also
 List of jazz-influenced classical compositions

References

Further reading

External links
 

Compositions by William Grant Still
Compositions in G minor
1937 compositions
Still